Adshead is an English-language toponymic surname originating from a location near Prestbury, Cheshire, England. Notable people with the surname include:

 Frank Adshead (1894–1977), English cricketer
 Gladys Lucy Adshead (1896–1985), writer of children's books
 Gwen Adshead (born 1960), English forensic psychotherapist
 Herbert Bealey Adshead (1862–1932), Canadian writer and politician
 John Adshead (born 1942), English football manager
 Joseph Adshead (1800–1861), British merchant and political campaigner from Manchester.
 Kay Adshead (born 1954), British actress, poet, and playwright
 Mary Adshead (1904–1995), English painter
 Mercia MacDermott (born 1927), English writer and historian
 Stephen Adshead (born 1980), English cricketer
 William Adshead (1901–1951), English cricketer

References 

English-language surnames
English toponymic surnames